Amiga Format was a British computer magazine for Amiga computers, published by Future plc. The magazine lasted 136 issues from 1989 to 2000. The magazine was formed when, in the wake of selling ACE to EMAP, Future split the dual-format title ST/Amiga Format into two separate publications (the other being ST Format). At the height of its success the magazines sold over 170,000 copies per month, topping 200,000 with its most successful ever issue.

History

Amiga Format can be thought of the "mother" or "big sister" magazine of Amiga Power, which it both predated and outlived. Whereas Amiga Power was strictly games-only, Amiga Format covered all aspects of Amiga computers, both hardware and software, both application and gaming uses. A further spin-off was Amiga Shopper, which dealt purely with the hardware and "serious" software side of the Amiga scene.

The magazine was published on a monthly basis and offered various multi-issue tutorials on different application software, such as C programming or LightWave graphics rendering. The last tutorial was cut short in the middle because of the cancellation of the magazine.

Amiga Format pioneered the concept of putting complete application software on a magazine coverdisk as a response to a moratorium on complete games titles being cover-mounted.

Amiga Format was the second-to-last regularly issued print magazine about the Amiga in the United Kingdom. The last was Amiga Active, which ran for 26 issues from October 1999, although Amiga Format was the only such magazine after CU Amiga Magazine's closure in October 1998 until the launch of Amiga Active.

Regular features

Reader Games

A notable regular feature in the later stage of the magazine (introduced by then-editor Nick Veitch) was Readers' Games. Here readers of the magazine could send in games they had programmed themselves, and the magazine staff would then publish a brief review of them. In the CD-ROM edition of the magazine, all the Readers' Games were also included on the covermount CD-ROM. Most of the games were written in AMOS BASIC or Blitz BASIC.

In one issue a competition was run to find the best game developed by a reader using a previously covermounted version of Blitz BASIC.  A game called Total Wormage was entered by Andy Davidson.

Although Total Wormage was disqualified as it was not submitted with working source code, Acid Software introduced Andy Davidson to Team17 at ECTS show in the same year which was the beginning of the legendary Worms.

Emulators
While the continuing uncertainty about the Amiga platform's future slowed software development, there was an increase in the interest surrounding emulation software. Longtime contributor Simon Goodwin contributed one of the longest running series to the magazine, which broke down emulators by target platform and went through the mechanics of getting them working

Just the FAQs
Introduced in issue 129 and continuing until the final issue, Just the FAQs consisted of a single page each month containing an interview with a prominent figure in the Amiga community, with the exception of the January 2000 issue (published in December 1999), which instead explained the limited effects the Year 2000 problem would have on the Amiga.

Interviews were conducted with Chris Wiles (managing director of Active Technologies), Neil Bothwick (founder of the Wirenet ISP), Alan Redhouse (of Eyetech), Wolf Dietrich (head of Phase 5 Digital Products), Andrew Elia (of AmigaSoc), and Ben Hermans (of Hyperion Entertainment). In the final issue, a special interview was conducted with Eric Schwartz's cartoon character Sabrina.

Backstage
Backstage was a four-page newsletter sent to subscribers with each issue. The tone of the newsletter was less formal than that of the magazine, and it would often provide behind-the-scenes information on the activities of prominent members of the Amiga Format staff. Backstage also gave details of the contents of the Subscribers' Superdisk (an extra floppy disk sent to subscribers, whose contents were also stored in a password-protected archive on the cover CD), and featured special offers for subscribers.

References

External links

 Amiga History Guide: Amiga Format
 David Viner - UK Computer Magazines
 Amiga Format Magazine Issue Archive
Archived articles originally published in Amiga Format:
 Amiga audio, networking and system stability
 A long-running series of articles about emulators (for other computers running on Amigas)

1989 establishments in the United Kingdom
2000 disestablishments in the United Kingdom
Amiga magazines
Defunct computer magazines published in the United Kingdom
Magazines established in 1989
Magazines disestablished in 2000
Mass media in Bath, Somerset
Monthly magazines published in the United Kingdom
Video game magazines published in the United Kingdom